Landis is a village in the Canadian province of Saskatchewan within the Rural Municipality of Reford No. 379 and Census Division No. 13. From 1907 to 1909, the post office at Section 23, Township 37, Range 18 west of the 3rd meridian, was known as Daneville. In 1925, Landis was a Canadian National Railway Station on the Grand Trunk Pacific Railway line.

History 
Landis incorporated as a village on May 17, 1909.

Demographics 

Education 
Landis had a K–12 school located within the Sun West School Division. The school was renovated in 1994 and then permanently closed in July 2014.

See also 
 List of communities in Saskatchewan
 List of villages in Saskatchewan
 Landis Power Station

References

Further reading 
The Landis Record written by the Landis Historical Society. There are currently two volumes of the Landis History Book.

External links 

Villages in Saskatchewan
Reford No. 379, Saskatchewan
Division No. 13, Saskatchewan